Cyperus silletensis is a species of sedge that is native to parts of Asia.

See also 
 List of Cyperus species

References 

silletensis
Plants described in 1834
Flora of Assam (region)
Flora of Myanmar
Flora of Bangladesh
Flora of Vietnam
Taxa named by Christian Gottfried Daniel Nees von Esenbeck